Mean Green is a compilation album released by American hip hop record label No Limit Records. It was released on September 29, 1998 and featured a majority of No Limit's artists, as well as other rappers including UGK and Mack 10. Like most No Limit albums at the time, this was a success and peaked at #9 on the Billboard 200 and #6 on the Top R&B/Hip-Hop Albums and sold 89,000 copies in its first week of release. The album was also certified Gold by the RIAA with over 500,000 copies shipped in just 5 weeks. The song by Passion "Don't Be Mad" was a success.

Music video
A music video for the single "Major Players" was released.

Track listing

Certifications

References

Albums produced by Ant Banks
Albums produced by Studio Ton
Hip hop compilation albums
Record label compilation albums
1998 compilation albums
No Limit Records compilation albums
Priority Records compilation albums
Gangsta rap compilation albums